Spink & Son (established 1666) are an auction and collectibles company known principally for their sales of coins, banknotes, stock and bond certificates and medals. They also deal in philatelic items, wine and spirits, and other collectible items.

History
John Spink founded a goldsmith's and pawnbroker's business near Lombard Street, London, in 1666. The Great Fire of London caused a temporary relocation before Spink returned to the rebuilt Lombard Street. In 1770 the firm moved to 2 Gracechurch Street where they traded in jewellery and coins.

In the 1850s, Spink started to deal in oriental art and in the 1880s they bought the Soho Mint and began to design and manufacture medals.

Publishing
The company published the Numismatic Circular from 1892 until 2014 when it was discontinued in favour of a quarterly coin auction format for selling coins. It was "the oldest continually published coin and medal catalogue". In 1996, Spink took over the entire publishing division of B.A. Seaby Ltd., publishers of the Seaby Coin & Medal Bulletin.

Spink is particularly well known for its annual Standard Catalogue of British Coins price guide and handbook, also part of the Seaby acquisition and founded in 1929. Already in 1962 it had been split in two parts, I. England and United Kingdom and II. Coins of Scotland, Ireland and the Islands, in annual editions and with black and white photos of the coins, and in 2007 it was converted to colour printing with newly-taken coin photographs. Later on, Volume I. was split further into Coins of England & the United Kingdom, Pre-Decimal Issues (2023: 58th edition), and Coins of England & the United Kingdom, Decimal Issues, both edited by Emma Howard.

Controversies 
In 2021, prosecuters and investigative journalists probed Spink & Son's relationship with antiquities trafficker Douglas Latchford, and in particular the creation of false documentation for Khmer antiquities. Latchford was indicted but Spink & Son was not charged.

References

External links 

Numismatics
London auction houses
Companies based in the London Borough of Camden
Retail companies established in 1666
Stamp dealers
Philatelic auctioneers
British Royal Warrant holders
1666 establishments in England